is a 2005 platform video game developed and published by Namco for the Nintendo DS. It stars a 3D Pac-Man as the user rolls him through the playing field using the touchscreen. The game sees Pac-Man; who has been turned into a ball, go on a journey with his new fairy companion Krystal, to save his friends from Golvis and the ghosts.

The game was originally released in Japan on July 28, 2005, with the North American release following on August 16, 2005 and in Europe on October 28, 2005.

Gameplay 
The objective of Pac 'n Roll is to maneuver Pac-Man to the goal plate at the end of the stage, while collecting Pac-Dots and avoiding ghosts. The player controls Pac-Man via the touchscreen by swiping him to roll around in the specified direction. Striking the screen will let Pac-Man perform a dash attack, which lets him break crates open and move faster.

Pac-Dots are spread throughout the level, and are needed to open Golvis Gates, which prevent the player from progressing without a certain number of Pac-Dots. Ghosts wander across the levels. If a ghost hits Pac-Man, it will have to be shooed off on the touchscreen; failing to do so will result Pac-Man gradually losing health until his life bar is fully depleted. Pac-Man loses a life if he falls off the course, or loses all his health. Power Pellets can be collected to allow Pac-Man to eat the ghosts.

Pac-Man can also eat chocolate bars to give him special attires, such as transforming him into a heavy knight and giving him a winged cap. Eating the Knight Chocolate gives Pac-Man knight attire, which increases his weight; making him fall faster and more difficult to move, but lets him break metal crates and lets Pac-Man walk underwater. The Wing Chocolate gives Pac-Man a winged cap, which lets him fall slower, allowing him to fly for short distances. The standard chocolate reverts Pac-Man back to his normal state.

Pac 'n Roll features six worlds, with each world (except the sixth and final world, which only has one stage) consisting of 4-6 stages. At the end of every world is a boss battle with Golvis. These levels take place on a narrow path, with Golvis chasing Pac from behind. Pac-Man must eat 3 Power Pellets, and hit Golvis three times to defeat him.

Completing a level unlocks extra versions of said level, including time trials and challenge modes.

The game also features a special world known as the "Pac-Moon", which is unlocked after clearing specific levels. The Pac-Moon consists of 3 special stages: the first stage is a direct port of the original Pac-Man with customizable settings (which, unlike the main game, uses the buttons for control), the second stage consisting of a stage seen at the game's E3 demo, and the third stage consisting of a 3D recreation of the original Pac-Man maze.

Plot
Taking place during Pac-Man's youth, Pac-Man spends a summer at the home of Pac-Master for training, to fight the ghosts in Pac-Land. During his training nights, he experiences a dream where he's being chased by a shadowy ghost. During Pac-Man's training, Pac-Master's family goes to the Power Pellet Harvest Festival with Pac-Man. The Ghosts, plotting a way to put an end to the Pac-Family, decide to summon the legendary rock and roll-loving ghost, Golvis, a ghost considered too powerful that the ghosts eventually sent him to space. At Castle Pac, the Pac-People celebrate the large crop of power pellets being harvested, until the festival is interrupted by Golvis' arrival. In an attempt to save the Pac-People, Pac-Master consumes a Power Pellet to scare the ghosts. While the other ghosts turn blue, Golvis remains unaffected. Golvis and Jack, his sentient guitar, cast a spell on the Pac-People, which transforms them into balls, and kidnaps them all. Before Pac-Man is sucked in, Pac-Land's guardian fairy, Krystal, stops Golvis and saves Pac-Man.

With Pac-Man being the last surviving member of the Pacs, Pac-Man travels across Pac-Land to save the Pac-People from Golvis: Pac-Baby, Pac-Master's wife, Pac-Dog and Pac-Girl. After saving Pac-Girl, Golvis attempts to strike Pac-Man from his UFO, which prompts Pac-Man and Krystal to invade his UFO and defeat him one last time. Pac-Man eventually defeats Golvis, and escapes from his crashing UFO alongside Pac-Master. With Golvis defeated, Golvis' curse on the Pac-People is broken, which restores the Pac-Man and his friends back to normal. The people of Pac-Land eventually hail Pac-Man as a celebrity for his heroic acts. 

Golvis, Jack and the ghosts eventually end up stranded in the unknown ocean. The ghosts condemn Golvis for his actions, while Jack reveals that the reason why he was sent away into space was primarily due to his clumsy personality.

Pac 'n Roll Remix
Pac 'n Roll was re-released on to the Wii in 2007 as part of Namco Museum Remix; it is renamed Pac 'n Roll Remix and instead of the controls using the touch screen, it uses the Wii Remote and Nunchuk. The story is also removed from this version of the game and the DS version's "Ghost Land" world is replaced with a new world titled "Golvis's Hideout". The Wii version's final boss is also different from the DS version's final boss. This version also doesn't include collectable gems, time trials, challenge stages, the "Pac-Moon" world, or the original Pac-Man. 

In North America, this version was also re-released again in 2010 as part of Namco Museum Megamix, also for Wii.

Pac 'n Roll Remix is included in Pac-Man Museum +, which was released on May 27, 2022. This version uses basic controls instead of motion-based controls.

Reception

Pac 'n Roll received mixed to positive reviews. In Japan, it sold 15,268 copies by the end of 2005.

Legacy 
Various tracks from the game would be used in GREE's Pac-Man Monsters.

Notes

References

External links

2005 video games
3D platform games
Namco games
Nintendo DS games
Pac-Man
Video games developed in Japan
Wii games